Cayucos State Beach is a protected beach in the state park system of California, United States.  It is located in Cayucos, San Luis Obispo County. The sandy beach environment supports uses of swimming and surfing. Prehistorically this general area of the central coast was inhabited by the Chumash people, who settled the coastal San Luis Obispo area approximately 10,000 to 11,000 BCE, including a large village to the south of Cayucos at Morro Creek.  The  park was established in 1940.

See also
List of beaches in California
List of California state parks

References

External links

 California StateParks: official Cayucos State Beach website

California State Beaches
Morro Bay
Parks in San Luis Obispo County, California
Beaches of Southern California
Beaches of San Luis Obispo County, California
1940 establishments in California
Protected areas established in 1940